The following places are named Knightsville:

Knightsville, Indiana, United States
Knightsville, Rhode Island, United States
Knightsville, Utah, a ghost town in the United States
Knightsville, Jamaica